In North Carolina, United States, the Sullivan Acts are a set of statutes passed by the North Carolina General Assembly in response to the bankrupting of all sewer and water districts in the City of Asheville and Buncombe County, North Carolina. As provided in the statute (Sullivan Act I), only the City of Asheville, in the provision of water, may not charge a higher rate for consumers outside city limits. Since the enactment of the legislation, several significant changes have come to Asheville: economic prosperity, adoption and termination of a City-County water agreement, and repeated efforts at overturning the legislation. While there are three Acts, the final two are modifications of the water agreement between the City of Asheville and Buncombe County.

Considering the scope of issues, ranging from home rule to water rights, many different avenues of solutions have been sought. A State Representative for the area (District 116) at the time, Tim Moffitt, initiated a study committee on the issue, but was met with local opposition. Many local citizens saw the move as continued domination by the North Carolina General Assembly and sought to regain water rights for Asheville. The study committee has recently decided to move control of the water system from the city to the Metropolitan Sewerage District.

Timeline
Below is the timeline of major events relating to the Sullivan Acts.
 1920's: "Water districts emerge outside the city, taxing their own residents.  They go broke during the Great Depression, and Buncombe County takes on the debt ... Asheville eventually annexes the areas, taking on the debt."
 1933: The Sullivan Act is passed.
 1955: "Asheville passes higher water rates for noncity customers."
 1958: "North Carolina Supreme Court upholds Sullivan and finds the higher rates illegal."
 1981: "Buncombe County and Asheville form a water authority, but it is not fully independent.  The agreement allows each government to take money from water system profits."
 2004: City announces termination of the water authority, per agreement rules, and plans to take control of the system.
 June 29, 2005: The North Carolina General Assembly "passes Sullivan II and Sullivan III, reinforcing the rate structure, requiring Asheville to extend water service to noncity residents and mandating that all water revenue go back into the water system."
 June 30, 2005: "The water agreement ends and the system becomes an Asheville department."
 August 10, 2005: "Asheville sues over the Sullivan Acts in Wake County Superior Court."
 February 2, 2007: "Judge Howard E. Manning Jr., finds in favor of the state and county."

History

The 1920s brought prosperity to many regions until the beginning of the Great Depression, which bankrupted many regions.  For the City of Asheville and Buncombe County, North Carolina, the Great Depression caused major economic damage that boiled over into other areas:

The most obvious implication of the legislation comes from the city's inability to incentivize annexation as many other cities do. However, the overall economics of Sullivan Act I meant a large percentage of water revenues were for debt obligations and general fund dollars were spent on expansion and maintenance. While the city fought against the law for years, Asheville contested in the Sullivan act in the 1950s and the North Carolina Supreme Court upheld the law.  Later on, the city launched a failed effort for the legislature to overturn the registration.

The City/County water agreement
Asheville faced exhaustive spending on the water system because the facilities were constructed around the 1920s and the revenue constriction of Sullivan Act I. In 1981, the city and county created a water agreement. Under this agreement, some rules were laid out:
 The water system was governed by a city and county appointed water authority.
 Asheville's City Manager still hired water system personnel.
 Titles for large city owned properties were transferred to the county, which they maintained and managed.
 Asheville "agreed not to mount further challenges to [the] Sullivan Act."
 "The county also agreed to pay all municipalities in the county a payment that represented the amount of the Sheriff's Department budget allocated to patrol and investigation functions."
 "Under the agreement, 5 percent of water revenues went to the city and 2.5 percent to the county."

As time passed, few problems occurred until 1994 when a potential water shortage threatened the area.

Henderson County is located just south of Buncombe County. Unfortunately, for all the parties involved, the new structure was very difficult. In 2003, Asheville had such dissatisfaction with maintenance and Buncombe County rejected implementing new fees.  Thus, "in 2005, Asheville dissolved a joint control agreement with Buncombe and Henderson counties and took sole ownership." For the city, repairs, better system control, growth control, better rates, and the promotion of voluntary annexation were all cited as reasons for termination of the water agreement. However, Buncombe County Commissioners, along with state representatives, stated that businesses needed to be protected. Thereby, the Commissioners petitioned the state legislature to reinforce the original Sullivan Act via Sullivan Acts II and III.

Current status
The last of the legal attempts to overturn the Sullivan Acts was 2008. Overall, courts have decided that "water customers in and outside the city, rather than city taxpayers, had the greatest stake in the system because bonds were backed by water bill payments, not city taxes." Technically, with the city-county agreement dissolved, Sullivan Acts II and III no longer apply. Only Sullivan Act I, reaffirmed by Sullivan Acts II and III, remains applicable law.

The most recent debate began when the North Carolina General Assembly placed tight restrictions on annexation along with Representative Moffitt's help on further restrictions specific to the Biltmore Lake subdivision that Asheville was attempting to involuntarily annex. Shortly thereafter, Asheville City Council "raised fees by a total of $340,000 on high volume users, including many businesses." The city cited a study supporting the increase because rates for high-volume users were low compared to similar areas. Representative Moffitt "called the rise 'arbitrary,' saying the city could pick and choose which studies to use." However, city leaders emphasized the fee increase as a necessary part of keeping up the system.

On May 4, 2011, Representative Tim Moffitt "introduced a bill that called for seizing the [water system] ... and handing it off to the Metropolitan Sewerage District."

Both representation and location plagued the committee as issues. The study committee was composed of four Republicans and one Democrat, with three of the committee members not located in the mountains of North Carolina (where Asheville is located). Moreover, in the actual area of the water system, two representatives, both Democrats, were left out of the committee. Based on the 2010 North Carolina General Assembly House Districts, these two representatives, Susan Fisher and Patsy Keever, represented approximately 61% of rate-payers. With 2012's redistricting, Fisher and Keever represent 68% of rate-payers. Thus, only one committee member, Tim Moffitt, represented Asheville and Representative Chuck McGrady represented Henderson County, where the water system was extended into the northern part of the county in 1994.  Respectively, these representatives represent 39% based on 2010 maps and 32% based on the 2012 redistricting maps.

On location, all committee meetings were held in Raleigh, except for the February 21, 2012, Public Hearing. The public hearing brought may residents, ratepayers, and elected officials from the cities and counties. While no Asheville residents who addressed the hearing favored any change, the response from elected officials was a little more mixed.

The news leading up to the decision date suggested a high likelihood of the regional metropolitan sewerage district regaining control, though the representation issues were not specifically worked out. On April 13, 2012, the study committee released a unanimous decision: "The General Assembly should mandate that the $173.5 million system be transferred to the public body that runs Buncombe's sewage system by 2013 ... Or the city and the Buncombe County Metropolitan Sewerage District can first work out a deal." As Representative Moffitt stated, "taking the system from the city would ensure that water customers outside Asheville would never be charged higher rates than city residents." Thereby, the study committee's recommendation continues to uphold the Sullivan Acts.  The Asheville City Council seems to be against the decision, though no official statement has been released. Overall, based on the study committee's report, privatization and consolidation of the region's water resources seem to be an end-goal.

References

North Carolina law